Lars Moholdt  (born 25 March 1985) is a Norwegian ski orienteering competitor.

He won a gold medal in the long distance at the 2015 World Ski Orienteering Championships.

References

1985 births
Living people
Norwegian orienteers
Ski-orienteers
20th-century Norwegian people
21st-century Norwegian people